USS Boone (FFG-28) was the twentieth ship in the United States Navy's  of guided missile frigates.

The frigate was named for Vice Admiral Joel Thompson Boone, M.D. (1889–1974).  FFG-28, the first U.S. ship to bear the admiral's name, was ordered 23 January 1978, launched 16 January 1980 by Todd Pacific Shipyards, and commissioned 15 May 1982. She has since earned numerous awards and commendations.

History
On 30 November 2006, the rudder fell off Mayport-based frigate Boone while on deployment in the western Mediterranean. The mishap forced the ship to send out a call for help to which Canadian destroyer  responded, providing divers who inspected the ship's underside. Within 24 hours, Boone was being towed to Rota for repairs by the German Navy's replenishment oiler Spessart. The ship was not adrift or totally dead in the water because its two 350-horsepower auxiliary propulsion units provided a "limited amount of maneuverability." The lost rudder was replaced 27 December and, after a day of operational testing, Boone got underway again on 28 December.

Boone was assigned to Destroyer Squadron 14 and was the recipient of the 2005 DESRON 14 Battle "E". On 16 February 2007, she was awarded the 2006 Battle "E" award.

Boone was homeported in Mayport, Florida, and was a member of the Navy Reserve. In March 2010, she was assigned to the United States Fifth Fleet fighting Somali piracy.

The last commanding officer of Boone was LCDR Robert Speight.

Boone was decommissioned on 23 February 2012.

Sinking
On 18 August 2022, Boone was towed to Campbeltown, Scotland to be sunk as part of a SINKEX involving Harpoon missiles fired by the Royal Navy Type 23 frigate , to test a new US targeting satellite. The SINKEX took place on 7 September 2022 with the participation of both US and UK forces. Meanwhile, from the air, she was struck by two Paveway IV laser-guided bombs from Royal Air Force Typhoon fighters, two JDAMs from US Air Force F-15 Eagles, a Martlet missile from Westminster's Wildcat helicopter and a Harpoon anti-ship missile from a US Navy P-8 Poseidon.

References

Further reading

External links

USS Boone Official site

1980 ships
Oliver Hazard Perry-class frigates of the United States Navy
Ships built in Seattle
Ships sunk as targets